Raphaël Marie Ze (4 November 1932, in Alangana – 6 September 2011, in Yaoundé) was the Roman Catholic bishop of the Diocese of Sangmélima, Cameroon. Ordained to the priesthood in 1962, Ze became bishop of the Sangmélima in 1997 and retired in 2008.

Career 
Ze was ordained as a priest on 29 April 1962. In May 1991 he was appointed Bishop of the diocese of Ebolowa-Kribi covering the departments of Mvila and Ntem Valley. The next year, he was appointed Bishop of Sangmélima, Cameroon, with the ordination taking place on 25 April 1992.

Under his leadership, the Diocese of Sangmélima increased the number of parishes from 12 to 21, divided into four pastoral areas: Akon, Djoum, Nkol-Ekong and Ndene. Ze was also Apostolic Administrator of the Diocese of Kribi-Ebolowa from 15 March 2002 to October 2004.

He retired as Bishop on 4 December 2008.

Notes

20th-century Roman Catholic bishops in Cameroon
1932 births
2011 deaths
21st-century Roman Catholic bishops in Cameroon
Roman Catholic bishops of Sangmélima